The Derwent is a river in Derbyshire, England. Throughout its course, the river mostly flows through the Peak District and its foothills.

Much of the river's route, with the exception of the city of Derby, is rural. However, the river has also seen many human uses, and between Matlock and Derby was one of the cradles of the Industrial Revolution. It is the site of the Derwent Valley Mills, the first industrial-scale cotton mills. Today it provides a water supply to several surrounding cities, and its steep-sided valley is an important communications corridor through the uplands of the Peak District.

The scenery of the Derwent valley attracts many tourists. The upper reaches pass through the Peak District National Park, whilst the middle reaches around the old spa town of Matlock Bath offer souvenir shops and amusement arcades, together with attractions such as the Heights of Abraham and its cable car.

Etymology

Course
It flows through the Upper Derwent Valley, and for most of its first  forms the county boundary between Derbyshire, on its west bank, and South Yorkshire, on the east bank. Some  into its journey it passes through three consecutive reservoirs: Howden, the highest, Derwent and Ladybower Reservoir. Derwent Reservoir is named after the now-submerged village of Derwent, which was named after the river. Once past Howden Reservoir, both banks of the river are in Derbyshire, and the river remains in the county to its mouth. Howden Reservoir is also fed by the River Westend, whilst Ladybower Reservoir is also fed by the River Ashop. The former confluences of the two tributaries with the Derwent are now submerged below the respective reservoirs.

Further south, the Derwent passes the village of Bamford, where it is joined by the River Noe. Below this confluence, it flows through Hathersage, Grindleford, Calver and Baslow, and through the estate of Chatsworth House, before it is joined by the River Wye at Rowsley. After passing through Darley Dale, the Derwent reaches Matlock, where, at an oxbow, it collects the Bentley Brook. It then flows past the villages of Matlock Bath, Cromford, Whatstandwell, and Ambergate, where it is joined by the River Amber.

Below Ambergate, the river flows through the town of Belper and the villages of Milford and Duffield, where it is joined by the River Ecclesbourne. It then enters the city of Derby near Darley Abbey and flows through the centre of the city. Its waters ultimately reach the North Sea via the Humber Estuary.

Natural history
The River Derwent is the habitat for many different animals such as otters, birds, insects, fish and crayfish. It is also a habitat for many wild flowers, as exemplified by the Lower Derwent Trail.

River uses
The lower river from Derwent Mouth upstream as far as Derby was made navigable under an Act of Parliament of 1720, and this stretch opened to navigation in 1721. Traffic ceased about 1795 and the navigation was acquired by the owners of the competing Derby Canal. The river is no longer considered navigable, although the upper river is widely used by kayakers and canoeists who enjoy the fast-flowing water and the slalom course at Matlock Bath.

The river was also used to power the many textile mills that were built along the Derwent between Matlock Bath and Derby. Initially, the need for water power was quite modest, for example Lombe's Silk Mill in Derby, which is considered to be the forerunner of the later cotton mills, only needed to use the power provided by a small mill stream, and Richard Arkwright's Cromford Mill, the world's first water-powered cotton spinning mill, only used a small tributary of the Derwent in conjunction with a lead mine sough. The later mills at Belper, Darley Abbey and Masson Mill were much larger and needed to harness the full power of the river to drive their complex machinery. This required the construction of large weirs across the Derwent that still remain as significant features in the riverscape.

These sites were all important in the development of the Industrial Revolution, and Arkwright's innovation, along with several local competitors, is recognised today by the designation of the area as the Derwent Valley Mills World Heritage Site.

The power of the Derwent is still harnessed at a number of these historic mill sites, producing hydro-electricity from turbines instead of driving mill wheels, with a recent development being the construction of a hydro-electric station at Longbridge weir, adjacent to the Riverside Gardens in Derby.

Howden and Derwent Reservoirs in the upper valley were both completed in 1916 to supply the cities of Sheffield, Nottingham, Derby, and Leicester. The adjacent Ladybower Reservoir was completed in 1945 to cover increasing demand.  Treated water from these reservoirs flows down the  Derwent Valley Aqueduct parallel to the river. The river also indirectly supplies Carsington Reservoir, with the water taken from the river by a pumping station at Ambergate in times of high flow. When flows are low, water is released back into the river via the same  route of tunnels and aqueducts, thus allowing greater abstraction rates downstream at Little Eaton in the drier summer months. Today all these reservoirs are managed by Severn Trent Water.

The valley of the Derwent provides an important communications route. Between Derby and Rowsley the valley is followed by the A6 road, which was the main road from London to Manchester until the creation of the motorway network, and is still a busy single-carriageway road. The former Midland Railway's lines from Derby to Sheffield and Manchester also followed the Derwent, the former as far as Ambergate and the latter as far as Rowsley. The Sheffield line still operates as part of the Midland Main Line, but the Manchester line was severed north of Matlock in 1968, and the section from Ambergate to Matlock now forms the Derwent Valley Line, a single-track branch line. Between Ambergate and Cromford, the river, road and railway are also paralleled by the Cromford Canal. The terminus was once connected to Manchester across the High Peak by the early Cromford and High Peak Railway.

Tributaries
Alphabetical listing of tributaries, extracted from the Water Framework Directive list of water bodies for the Derbyshire Derwent:

River Amber
River Ashop
Bar Brook, which joins the Derwent near Baslow
Black Brook, near Belper
Bottle Brook, at Little Eaton
Bentley Brook
Chaddesden Brook, in Derby
River Ecclesbourne
Highlow Brook, near Hathersage
Hood Brook, also near Hathersage
Lea Brook, near High Peak Junction
Ladybower Brook (Highshore Clough Catchment), flows into Ladybower Reservoir
Markeaton Brook, joins the Derwent in Derby
River Noe
River Westend
River Wye

Naming
The River Derwent provides the name for the oldest hockey club in Derbyshire. Derwent Hockey Club was established in 1897 and played its matches on the banks of the Derwent in Darley Dale, before relocating to Wirksworth.
It also gives its name to Derwent Rowing Club in Derby, founded in 1857.

Curiosities 
The pureness of the river has also been commented on by Charles Cotton – "Piscator" in Izaac Walton's Compleat Angler.

Gallery

See also
2019 United Kingdom floods
List of rivers of England
Rivers of the United Kingdom
List of crossings of the River Derwent, Derbyshire
Handyside Bridge

References

External links

Web page on River Derwent from DerbyshireUK

 
 
Geography of Amber Valley
River Derwent
Rivers of Derbyshire
Rivers and valleys of the Peak District
Tributaries of the River Trent